Pobeda is a rural locality (a village) in Arkh-Latyshsky Selsoviet, Arkhangelsky District, Bashkortostan, Russia. The population was 71 as of 2010. There are 4 streets.

Geography 
Pobeda is located 11 km southwest of Arkhangelskoye (the district's administrative centre) by road. Zaitovo is the nearest rural locality.

References 

Rural localities in Arkhangelsky District